Mr. What was an Irish bred, Irish-trained Thoroughbred racehorse noted for winning the 1958 Grand National.

An eight-year-old gelding owned by David Coughlan, trained by Tom Taaffe. Mr. What was ridden by The Queen Mother's jockey Arthur Freeman who put up  overweight. Appearing ideally suited by the heavy conditions, the horse won by 30 lengths, despite stumbling at the last fence. Mr. What finished third in both the 1959 and the 1962 runnings of the National, but never won another race.

References

Grand National winners
Thoroughbred family 3-i
Racehorses bred in the United Kingdom
Racehorses trained in Ireland
National Hunt racehorses
1950 racehorse births